The Virtue Hills are a mountain range in Baker County, Oregon.

References 

Mountain ranges of Oregon
Mountain ranges of Baker County, Oregon